Nico Gorzel (born 29 July 1998) is a German professional footballer who plays as a defensive midfielder for  club Erzgebirge Aue.

Career
On 17 September 2019, Gorzel joined Austrian Bundesliga club SKN St. Pölten on a free transfer, signing a contract until the summer 2021.

Gorzel joined 3. Liga club Erzgebirge Aue on 19 June 2022, after his former club Türkgücü München had been relegated after filing for insolvency.

References

External links

 

1998 births
Living people
German footballers
Association football midfielders
FC Liefering players
SC Wiener Neustadt players
SKN St. Pölten players
Türkgücü München players
FC Erzgebirge Aue players
Austrian Football Bundesliga players
2. Liga (Austria) players
3. Liga players
German expatriate footballers
German expatriate sportspeople in Austria
Expatriate footballers in Austria